Lab Rats, also known as Lab Rats: Bionic Island for the fourth season, is an American comedy television series created by Chris Peterson and Bryan Moore that aired on Disney XD from February 27, 2012 to February 3, 2016. The series stars Billy Unger, Spencer Boldman, Kelli Berglund, Tyrel Jackson Williams, and Hal Sparks.

Series overview

Episodes

Season 1 (2012)

Season 2 (2013–14)

Season 3 (2014–15)

Season 4: Bionic Island (2015–16)

See also 
 List of Lab Rats characters

Notes

References 

Lists of American children's television series episodes
Lists of American comedy television series episodes
Lists of Disney Channel television series episodes